Léopold Morice (1846, Nîmes - 1919, Paris) was a French sculptor.

Life

An apprentice in Auguste Bosc's studio then in François Jouffroy's studio, he was later admitted to the École nationale supérieure des beaux-arts aged 19.  His talent gained him several medals during his training there. He won several contracts in 1875 in Paris, Dunkerque, Nîmes, Pompignan, at Le Vigan and in Venezuela.

One of his most notable works is the statue of Marianne in Place de la République in Paris, on a pedestal by his brother, the architect François-Charles Morice (1848–1908).

In 1910 and 1911 he produced two monuments in memory of Louis-Joseph de Montcalm, one at Montcalm's birthplace of Vestric-et-Candiac (Cantal) and the other in Québec, where Montcalm died. In writing of these monuments, Georges Bellerive stated:

Morice was awarded the Chevalier dans l'Ordre de la Legion d'Honneur in 1888.

In his lifetime, Morice taught many aspiring artists.  One of his most prized students was Jules Edouard Roiné.

References

1846 births
1919 deaths
People from Nîmes
20th-century French sculptors
19th-century French sculptors
French male sculptors
Chevaliers of the Légion d'honneur
19th-century French male artists